Müfit is a Turkish given name for males. People named Müfit include:

 Müfit Erkasap, Turkish football coach
 Ali Müfit Gürtuna (born 1952), Turkish politician
 Mazhar Müfit Kansu (1873–1948), Turkish civil servant and politician

Turkish masculine given names